The Workington Opera House, or The Opera as it was known, is a purpose built theatre located in Workington, Cumbria, England. Originally built as the Queen’s Jubilee Hall & Opera House it was gutted by fire in 1927 and rebuilt with a fine wide auditorium, and Ornamental ceiling with seating for 1200. The theatre has good sightlines and a large stage and currently sits empty after its former use as a bingo hall ended in 2004.

History

The theatre was designed by T. L. Banks & Townsend and had a small auditorium with two balconies accommodating 1,130 people. The theatre was also equipped with a small stage with a proscenium width of 11 metres, a depth of 9.14 metres and a grid height of 14 metres. An orchestra pit for 16 musicians was also included.

Other names:
Queen's Jubilee Hall
Dates:
Opened 1888. Date of first use not known.
1888 - Design/Construction:
T.L. Banks & Townsend - Architect
1897-1900 - Alteration: reconstructed after explosion (architect unknown)
1927-1930 - Alteration: reconstructed after fire (architect unknown)
1963-1970 - Alteration: façade rebuilt (architect unknown)

Current owners

Graves (Cumberland) Ltd currently own the building and have planning permission for 5 years to replace the theatre with retail and residential units. Graves own many different assets across Cumbria including cinemas, bingo halls and in the past they owned and ran a number of theatres.

The future of the theatre

The Workington Opera House is now under threat of demolition to be replaced with retail units and flats. The Save Workington Opera House group are fighting to have this building made available to the town of Workington as a working civic theatre that the community can be proud of.

Specifications
Capacities:
Original: 1,330
After 1950: 1,219
Listings:
Grade not listed
Stage type:
Proscenium
Dimensions
Stage dimensions:
Depth: 9.14m
Proscenium width: 11m
Height to grid: 14m
Orchestra pit: Original, for 16 musicians

References

External links 

 workingtonoperahouse.co.uk
 OperaAction.co.uk
 Opera House (Workington)-Theatres Trust
 The Opera House, Pow Street, Workington, Cumbria

Theatres in Cumbria
Theatres in Workington
Theatres completed in 1930
Opera houses in England
Art Deco architecture in England
Theatres completed in 1888
Music venues completed in 1888